Broscodera is a genus of beetles in the family Carabidae, first described by Carl Hildebrand Lindroth in 1961.

Species 
Broscodera contains the following species:
 Broscodera chukuai Kavanaugh & Liang, 2021
 Broscodera dreuxi Deuve, 1990
 Broscodera gaoligongensis Kavanaugh & Liang, 2021
 Broscodera holzschuhi Wrase, 1995
 Broscodera insignis Mannerheim, 1852
 Broscodera morvani Deuve, 2004

References

Broscinae
Carabidae genera